The Eastern Shore Stakes was an American Thoroughbred horse race run between 1913 and 1949 at Havre de Grace Racetrack, in Havre de Grace, Maryland. A race for two-year-old horses of either sex, it was inaugurated and run for most of its existence as the Eastern Shore Handicap.

Distances
The Eastern Shore Stakes has been run at various distances with thirty of its thirty-seven runnings at its longest distance of six furlongs.
 6 furlongs: 1916, 1918-1945
 5.5 furlongs: 1913-1915, 1917, 1948
 5 furlongs: 1946-1947
 4.5 furlongs: 1949

Historical notes
On September 23, 1913 Tranid won the five and one-half furlong inaugural running of the Eastern Shore Handicap by two lengths for owner Schuyler L. Parsons. Tranid was trained by William H. Karrick and ridden by his son Kenneth.

Hourless, bred in France and foaled in England, was brought to race in the United States by his prominent owner and breeder, August Belmont Jr. In addition to winning the 1916 Eastern Shore Handicap, he won with three other important stakes for that age group. In 1917, Hourless won the Belmont Stakes and would be recognized as the U.S. Co-Champion Three-Year-Old Male Horse.

The 1917 edition of the Eastern Shore Handicap was won by Tippity Witchet, a gelding that would have a very successful career in racing which remarkably only ended twelve years later at age fourteen.

Future U.S. Racing Hall of Fame inductee Billy Kelly won the September 21, 1918 Eastern Shore Handicap for owner J. K. L. Ross who had purchased the horse on August 9 from  trainer and co-owner William Perkins for $27,500.

Careful won the 1920 edition for owner Walter Salmon and would earn that year's American Co-Champion Two-Year-Old Filly honors.  She came back to the Havre de Grace track the following year and defeated male competition again in winning the Chesapeake Stakes for three-year-olds. In 1922 Careful had another brilliant year that saw her named American Champion Older Female Horse. 

Morvich kept his 1921 unbeaten streak going with his win in the Eastern Shore Handicap. He finished the year a perfect 11 for 11 and would go on to win the 1922 Kentucky Derby.

The 1930 running was won by Harry Whitney's Equipoise who would be chosen that year's U.S. Champion 2-Year-Old Colt. In a career hampered by serious health problems that limited his racing, Equipoise came back to be the dominant horse in racing during 1932 and 1933, earning American Horse of the Year honors.  At stud Equipoise was the Leading sire in North America for 1942 and following its creation, induction into the U.S. Racing Hall of Fame in 1957.

In 1933 High Quest won the Eastern Shore in which he defeated two future Hall of Famers, Discovery and Cavalcade. As a three-year-old, High Quest would win the second leg of the U.S. Triple Crown series, the Preakness Stakes.

Rosemont won the 1934 race, easily defeating Nellie Flag and twelve other runners. Rosemont would race successfully through age five, most notably winning the 1937 Santa Anita Handicap in which he defeated the great Seabiscuit.

War Admiral won the 1936 Eastern Shore Handicap by five lengths in stakes record time. He returned to the Havre de Grace track on April 26, 1937 and won the Chesapeake Stakes, a final prep before winning the Kentucky Derby. War Admiral went on to become the fourth horse in history to capture the U.S. Triple Crown.

In 1941, Alsab and Cochis raced to a dead heat win. Colchis met with good success in racing, notably winning the 1942 Chesapeake Stakes by beating Alsab who had been voted the 1941 U.S. Champion Two-Year-Old Colt.  In the ensuing Triple Crown races, Alsab ran second in the 1942 Kentucky Derby then won the Preakness before finishing second in the Belmont Stakes. His performances for the remainder of the year earned Alsab 1942 U.S. Champion Three-Year-Old Colt honors. 
He would be inducted into the U.S. Racing Hall of Fame in 1976.

World War II saw racing restricted in the United States and Havre de Grace Racetrack was forced to cancel all of its spring races in 1943. However, arrangements were made to run the Eastern Shore Handicap at Pimlico Race Course. Similarly, with wartime rationing still in place, for both 1944 and 1945 Laurel Park agreed to host the Eastern Shore Handicap. 

Noble Impulse's winning time of 1:04 3/5 in the 1948 Eastern Shore broke the track record for five and one-half furlongs on dirt.

The final running of the Eastern Shore Stakes took place on May 4, 1949 and was won by Quiz Show owned by Frank Rosen's Palatine Stable.

Havre de Grace Racetrack was closed permanently at the end of the 1950 spring meeting.

Records
Speed record:
 1:11.00 @ 6 furlongs - War Admiral (1936)

Most wins by a jockey:
 3 - Earl Sande (1918, 1919, 1926)
 3 - John Gilbert (1934, 1943, 1949)

Most wins by a trainer:
 3 - H. Guy Bedwell (1918, 1919, 1939)

Most wins by an owner:
 2 - J. K. L. Ross (1918, 1919)
 2 - J. Edwin Griffith (1924, 1925)
 2 - Alfred G. Vanderbilt Jr. (1935, 1937)
 2 - Bobanet Stable (R. Bruce Livie) (1944, 1945)

Winners

References

Discontinued horse races
Flat horse races for two-year-olds
Open sprint category horse races
Horse races in Maryland
Havre de Grace Racetrack
Recurring sporting events established in 1913
Recurring sporting events disestablished in 1950